Tarakaasura is a 2018 Indian action thriller film written and directed by Chandrashekar Bandiyappa and produced by Narasimhulu. Introducing Vybhav and also starring Manvitha. The film also marked Kannada debut of  Danny Sapani playing the lead villain. The film got a huge response for its making and story based on a tribe called "Budbudke", also known as Halakki Vokkaliga which is on the verge of extinction.

The film was shot in Mysuru, Mandya, Chamarajanagara in Karnataka and Varanasi in Uttar Pradesh. The film had completed 50 days of successful theatrical run.

Cast
 Vybhav
 Manvitha as Muttamma
 Danny Sapani as Kalinga 
 Sadhu Kokila
 Mata Koppala

Soundtrack

References 

Indian action thriller films
2010s Kannada-language films
2018 action thriller films
Films directed by Chandrashekar Bandiyappa